William Arthur Robbins (4 February 1920 – 8 November 2010) was an Australian rules footballer who played for the Collingwood Football Club in the Victorian Football League (VFL).

Robbins enlisted in the Australian Army in July 1940 and served for the remainder of World War II. Part of his service was in the 1st Naval Bombardment Group on HMAS Shropshire and while serving he played two games for Collingwood in the 1944 VFL season.

Notes

External links 

		
Profile on Collingwood Forever

1920 births
2010 deaths
Australian rules footballers from Victoria (Australia)
Collingwood Football Club players